The Holboca is a right tributary of the river Neajlov in Romania. It discharges into the Neajlov in Bărăceni.

References

Rivers of Romania
Rivers of Dâmbovița County